"Turn Around" is the debut single by British electronic dance music duo Phats & Small, released on 22 March 1999 from their debut album, Now Phats What I Small Music. The song samples vocals, primarily from the first verse, of Toney Lee's "Reach Up" and  Change's "The Glow of Love". It reached number two on the UK Singles Chart.

Music video
The accompanying music video for the track is shot at various locations in the city of Brighton and Hove. Ben Ofoedu appears in the video, miming to the vocals.

Impact and legacy
MTV Dance ranked "Turn Around" number 38 in their list of "The 100 Biggest 90's Dance Anthems of All Time" in 2011.

Tomorrowland included the song in their official ranking of "The Ibiza 500" in 2020.

Track listing
 CD maxi-single
"Turn Around" (Radio Edit) – 3:31
"Turn Around" (Original 12-inch Mix) – 7:36
"Turn Around" (Norman Cook Remix) – 6:09
"Turn Around" (Chris & James Remix) – 7:28
"Turn Around" (Olav Basoski Remix) – 7:56

Charts and certifications

Weekly charts

Year-end charts

Certifications

Remixes

"Turn Around" (Phats & Small vs. The Cube Guys)
This EP was released in 2012 via Ego. It contains original and dub mixes.

 "Turn Around" (Original Mix) – 6:55
 "Turn Around" (Dub Mix) – 6:55

"Turn Around (Hey What's Wrong with You)"
In 2016, "Turn Around" was released a remix package under Armada Music, using Ofoedu's original vocals. It contains remixes by Calvo, Futuristic Polar Bears, Maison & Dragen, Mousse T. and an updated version by Phats & Small.

 "Turn Around (Hey What's Wrong with You) (Extended Mix)" - 5:29
 "Turn Around (Hey What's Wrong with You) (Calvo Extended Remix)" - 4:48
 "Turn Around (Hey What's Wrong with You) (Futuristic Polar Bears Extended Remix)" - 4:26
 "Turn Around (Hey What's Wrong with You) (Maison & Dragen Extended Remix)" - 4:40
 "Turn Around (Hey What's Wrong with You) (Mousse T.'s Dirty Little Funker Extended Mix)" - 8:13

In 2018, it was released in a bootleg version by Youngr, also under Armada Music.

 "Turn Around" (Youngr bootleg) – 3:26

Three new remixes came out in 2020, also under Armada.

 "Turn Around (Hey What's Wrong with You) (Robosonic Extended Remix)" - 7:04
 "Turn Around (Hey What's Wrong with You) (Mousse T.'s Dirty Little Funker Extended Mix)" - 8:13
 "Turn Around (Hey What's Wrong with You) (Babert Extended Remix)" - 5:30

References

1998 songs
1999 debut singles
British dance songs
British house music songs
Multiply Records singles
Songs written by Mauro Malavasi
Sony Music singles